This is a list of Copa Libertadores winning football managers.  Uruguayan manager Roberto Scarone led Peñarol to success in the inaugural Copa Libertadores finals in 1960 and repeated the feat the following season.  Argentine clubs and managers dominated the competition in the late 1960s and 1970s, winning 12 out of 15 tournaments from 1964 to 1978. In the 1990s Brazilian clubs and managers dominated the competition with six wins from 1992 to 1999, after which the second period of Argentine dominance began, with seven wins in the period from 2000 to 2009.

As of the most recent 2021 final, Argentine managers have been the most successful, winning 27 out of 62 tournaments held, followed by Brazilians with 18 wins and Uruguayans with 10 titles. On only eight occasions the tournament was won by foreign managers: then-Yugoslav coach Mirko Jozić led Chilean side Colo-Colo to victory in 1991, and Argentine Edgardo Bauza won the tournament with Ecuadorian club LDU Quito. All three wins by Paraguayan side Olimpia came under foreign managers: Uruguayan Luis Cubilla led them to victory in 1979 and 1990, and Argentine Nery Pumpido in 2002. Portuguese managers Jorge Jesus and Abel Ferreira won the title with Brazilian sides Flamengo and Palmeiras, respectively. Jesus won it in 2019 and Ferreira in 2020 and 2021. Jozić, Jesus, and Ferreira are also the only managers from outside South America to have won the competition.

The most successful individual manager is Argentine Carlos Bianchi who won the tournament on four occasions, leading Vélez Sársfield to success in 1994, and then again Boca Juniors in 2000, 2001 and 2003. He is followed by fellow Argentine Osvaldo Zubeldía with three consecutive wins in 1968, 1969 and 1970 (all with Estudiantes), while eleven other managers won the tournament twice.

Along with Carlos Bianchi, only three other managers have won the title with more than one club: Brazilians Paulo Autuori (with Cruzeiro in 1997 and São Paulo in 2005), Luiz Felipe Scolari (with Grêmio in 1995 and Palmeiras in 1999), and Argentine Edgardo Bauza (with LDU Quito in 2008 and San Lorenzo in 2014). Bauza is also the only manager to have won the competition with two clubs from different countries.

The data below does not include the 1948 South American Championship of Champions, as it is not listed by CONMEBOL either as a Copa Libertadores edition or as an official competition. However, at least in the years 1996 and 1997, CONMEBOL entitled equal status to both Copa Libertadores and the 1948 tournament, in that the 1948 champion club (CR Vasco da Gama) was allowed to participate in Supercopa Libertadores, a CONMEBOL official competition that allowed participation for former Libertadores champions only (for example, not admitting participation for champions of other CONMEBOL official competitions, such as Copa CONMEBOL).

By year

Managers with multiple titles

By nationality
This table lists the total number of titles won by managers of each nationality.

See also
Copa Libertadores records and statistics

References
General

Specific

Managers
Copa Libertadores de America